Kettering Rugby Football Club (KRFC) is a rugby union club located in Waverley Road on the south side of Kettering, England.  The 1st XV currently compete in Midlands Premier - a level 5 league in the English rugby union system - following their promotion as champions of Midlands 1 East at the end of the 2018-19 season.

History
The earliest available records indicate that the playing of rugby football in Kettering was initiated by the Rector of Barton Seagrave village in 1871. After a period of playing under Uppingham Public School Rules the club formally adopted RFU rules in 1875, quickly becoming a significant participant in both local community and the fast developing rugby scene in the East Midlands.

In the early days games were played on a number of sites including farmers' fields and council owned grounds. It was during this period, prior to adopting a home of its own, that the club developed its high profile in the town. Social occasions and players' "meetings" were held traditionally at the Royal Hotel, later moving to the George, with more formal occasions such as the Annual Ball becoming the highlight of the local function calendar.

The club moved to its current Waverley Road home in 1963 where it boasts three pitches, additional training areas and a fully licensed club house.

KRFC today

Kettering currently play in the Midlands 1 East division of the league pyramid which is level 6.

The club regularly fields four senior sides plus Colts and Veterans on a Saturday and has a thriving mini and junior section with teams at every age group from under 6 to under 16.

The mini and junior section has produced three current Premiership players in James Cannon (Wasps)(Connacht)(Ealing Trailfinders), Brett Sturgess (Exeter Chiefs) and Will Chudley (Exeter Chiefs) (Bath Rugby)as well as a number of players playing professional and semi professional rugby at Championship and National 1 levels

Club Honours
Midlands East 2 champions: 1992–93
Midlands East 1 champions: 1995–96
Midlands 1 East champions (3): 2002–03, 2007–08, 2018–19
East Midlands Cup Winners 2014-15

Recent League results
2016/17 Midlands 1 East 2nd
2015/16 Midlands 1 East 4th
2014/15 Midlands 1 East 4th
2013/14 Midlands 1 East 6th
2012/13 Midlands 1 East 9th
2011/12 Midlands 1 East 4th
2010/11 Midlands 1 East 8th
2009/10 National League 3 Midlands 13th (relegated)
2008/09 Midlands 1 8th
2007/08 Midlands 2 East 1st (champions, promoted)

Current 1st XV squad

Featured during 2018-19 season

Forwards:
D Martin, S Ling, S Fraher, J Aldwinckle, M Watson, L Santos, M Cheatham, A Jones, J Cox; C Horgan, A Toseland, D Bannister, G Newman, A Bayley, A Collett, T Spencer, G Wilson, D Ireland, D Noble, T Bayes, C Chapman, J Watts, K Smith, B Sturgess, D Fay, A Kelman, G Newman

Backs:
T Bridgeman, B Keir, J Butlin, J Taylor, J Luthayi, A Linnell J Daniel, R Conyard, D Conyard, L Conyard, A Byrne, J Plowright, G Rees, O Furniss, E Drake-Lee, H Styles, J Newman

Notable former players

Notes

References

External links
 Rugby Football Union
 Kettering Rugby Football Club homepage

English rugby union teams
Rugby union in Northamptonshire
Rugby clubs established in 1875
1875 establishments in England